Arroyito is a city in Córdoba Province, Argentina. Arroyito earned the nickname Sweet City (Ciudad Dulce).

Etymology 
Arroyito can be translated as "little stream", or "little brook". It was named after a stream (now disappeared) that crossed this settlement and landed on the Xanaes river. The first records referred to this settlement as paraje del Arroyito or El Arroyito.

History

Early settlement 
It is not clear when Arroyito was founded. The oldest document that mentions it was the first census of the Viceroyalty of the Río de la Plata on 23 November 1778, with a resulting population of 220 inhabitants. This hamlet was known as Villa Arroyito, and was the place chosen by the Spanish soldier José Ignacio Urquía to build a church dedicated to the Virgin of Mercy, completed in 1790.

In 1865, the total population for Arroyito was 228 inhabitants, according to the first census in Argentina.

Economy 

The first main economic activity of Arroyito was forrest-spacing. Baldassare Dalle Mura and Raffaello Bianchi, both Italian immigrants from Tuscany, were the owners of the two most important sawmills of that time. As the land emptied, other people used it for agriculture. But the Great Depression directly attacked the raw material that sustained the sawmills, so they had to close, giving rise to emigration and decline.

In the early 1950s, a group of young entrepreneurs led by Fulvio Salvador Pagani decided to come together to set up a candy factory. The dream was to offer consumers around the world quality products at a fair price became true on 5 July 1951 with the opening of the first candy factory. This is how Arcor was born, and Arroyito began a definitive new awakening, so the workforce was necessary, causing a very notable population increase.

Twin towns 
  Verzuolo, Italy (2003)

References

External links 
  

Populated places in Córdoba Province, Argentina
Cities in Argentina
Córdoba Province, Argentina
Argentina